WVWP-LP is a Classic rock and Blues formatted broadcast radio station licensed to and serving Wayne, West Virginia.  WVWP-LP is owned and operated by Wayne High School.

References

External links
 

2015 establishments in West Virginia
Blues radio stations
Classic rock radio stations in the United States
Radio stations established in 2015
VWP-LP
VWP-LP